That's My Baby is an American television program that follows pregnant animals and their owners through the birth process. It was broadcast on Animal Planet between 2001 and 2003.

Summary
Episodes are split into four parts. The first introduces the pregnant animal and its owners (or handlers or trainers) and provides the mother's backstory. The next part shows the owners/handlers/trainers preparing for the birth. The third part features the animal giving birth. The fourth part shows the babies bonding with their mothers and the humans who look after them. Some episodes show stillbirths and deaths. (For example, a Thoroughbred mare named Whimsical Treasure lost her foal in a breech birth). Other times, the mother is unable to take good care of its offspring, so it is hand reared. (For example, Betsy the giraffe had her calf taken away when she was unable to properly nurse it.)

An episode features Celeste Yarnall and her cat Mimosa.

Animals featured and their names

Home media
 Bottlenose dolphin - Mattie was released on VideoNow PVD in 2003 for the VideoNow Player.
 Hippo - Cleo was released on DVD in 2009 as part of the Animal Planet compilation "Hippos & Rhinos" in the US.
 Black rhino - Jody, and Humboldt penguin - Penny were released on DVD in 2012 as an Animal Planet compilation DVD "That's My Baby: Jody & Penny" in India.

External links
 

Animal Planet original programming
2001 American television series debuts
2003 American television series endings
Television series about mammals